Bureysky District  is an administrative and municipal district (raion), one of the twenty in Amur Oblast, Russia. Its administrative center is the urban locality (a work settlement) of Novobureysky. Population:  28,211 (2002 Census);  The population of Novobureysky accounts for 34.7% of the district's total population.

References

Notes

Sources

Districts of Amur Oblast